Péter Papp (6 October 1930 – 16 September 1958) was a Hungarian basketball player. He competed in the men's tournament at the 1952 Summer Olympics.

References

1930 births
1958 deaths
Hungarian men's basketball players
Olympic basketball players of Hungary
Basketball players at the 1952 Summer Olympics
Sportspeople from Szeged